Jens-Peter Wrede (born: 19 April 1957) is a sailor from Hamburg, West-Germany, who represented his country at the 1988 Summer Olympics in Busan, South Korea as helmsman in the Soling. With crew members Stefan Knabe and Matthias Adamczewski they took the 15th place.

References

Living people
1957 births
Sailors at the 1988 Summer Olympics – Soling
Olympic sailors of West Germany
German male sailors (sport)